Ivan Joseph Hutchinson (11 February 1928 – 7 October 1995) was an Australian film critic, television personality and music director.

Hutchinson was active in the industry for over 30 years, from the early 1960s until the mid-1990s, first on Melbourne-only programs for HSV-7 and later nationwide through the entire Seven Network.

In the early 1970s he appeared alongside film and TV journalist Jim Murphy on Channel 7 in probably Australian TV's first regularly-scheduled evening movie review program entitled “Two on the Aisle”. Hutchinson later moved into the roles of midday and classic movie host and appeared in numerous local film cameos usually playing himself or a critic.

In his last years, Hutchinson was a film columnist for The Sun News-Pictorial and its successor, the Herald Sun.

In addition to his on-air role for Seven, Hutchinson was a studio and session pianist serving as the band leader, arranger and music director for most of the variety shows and specials originating from HSV-7 throughout 1964 to 1994.

See also
 Bill Collins
 John Hinde
 Margaret Pomeranz
 David Stratton

References

External links
 

Australian film critics
Australian television personalities
1928 births
1995 deaths
Television personalities from Melbourne